is a village located in Nagano Prefecture, Japan. , the village had an estimated population of 7,661 in 2445 households, and a population density of 174 persons per km².

Geography
Hara is located in eastern Nagano Prefecture. The village is located in a mountainous area, and includes Mount Yatsugatake partly within its borders.

Surrounding municipalities
Nagano Prefecture
 Chino
 Fujimi

Climate
The village has a humid continental climate characterized by warm and humid summers, and cold winters with heavy snowfall (Köppen climate classification Dfa).

History
The area of present-day Hara was part of ancient Shinano Province. The present village of Hara was established on April 1, 1889 by the establishment of the modern municipalities system.

Demographics
Per Japanese census data, the population of Hara has grown slightly over the past 50 years.

Economy
The economy of Hara is based on agriculture.

Education
Hara has one public elementary school and one public  junior high school operated by the village government. The village does not have a high school.

Transportation

Railway
The village has no passenger railway service.

Highway
  Chūō Expressway

International relations
 – Pukekohe, New Zealand, sister city since May 2, 1974

Local attraction
Akyū ruins, a National Historic Site
Yatsugatake Museum of Art

Notable people from Hara
Risa Itō, manga artist

References

External links

Official Website 

 
Villages in Nagano Prefecture